Adieu Godard (stylized as adieu GODARD) is a 2021 Odia language independent feature film written and directed by Amartya Bhattacharyya. The film world premiered at the 43rd Moscow International Film Festival 2021. In India, the film got officially selected at festivals like IFFK (Kerala), KIFF (Kolkata), Bengaluru (BIFFES), Pune (PIFF) etc. Adieu Godard also won Best Film Award in the Indian Languages competition at the 27th Kolkata International Film Festival 2022 and the 'Third Best Indian Cinema Award' at the 13th Bengaluru International Film Festival 2022.

The film is produced under the banner of Odisha based production company Swastik Arthouse, in association with Kolkata based FilmStop Entertainment and the French company Les Films de la Haute-Vallée.

Release 
Adieu Godard released in theaters of India on September 2, 2022. The film was released in India by Platoon distribution, while renowned star of Odia cinema, Anu Choudhury, presented it. The film ran in theaters for four weeks in Odisha, and apart from Bhubaneswar, Cuttack, Rourkela, the film was also released in Kolkata, New Delhi and Bangalore with a special show at Jaipur and Mumbai. While the film was running in theaters in India, Jean-Luc Godard committed assisted suicide on September 13, 2022. 

The film was greeted with a lot of enthusiasm from notable film personalities like Anurag Kashyup and Taran Adarsh. Apart from India, the film was also digitally released in the US and Canada through the US based distributor - Film Movement.

Cast 

 Choudhury Bikash Das as Ananda
 Sudharsri Madhusmita as Shilpa
 Dipanwit Dashmohapatra  as Joe
 Swastik Choudhury as Jatin
 Choudhury Jayaprakash Das as Harideb
 Shankar Basu Mallick as Jaga
 Abhishek Giri as Pablo
 Dr. Banikanta Mishra as Dr.Tripathy
 Swetapadma Satpathy as Ananda's Wife
 Sumit Panda as Tutu
 Sandip Bal as Angry Villager
 Sridhar Martha as DVD Seller

Critical reception 
The film was screened at various film festivals in India and abroad. Adieu Godard featured in the list of top 10 films to look out for at the Moscow Film Festival.

Devika Girish of The New York Times wrote that "This limp satire about an Indian villager’s encounter with the movies of Jean-Luc Godard rehashes regressive stereotypes and squanders a potent premise".

Film festival screenings

References 

Indian independent films
2020s Odia-language films